The canton of Bourg-Saint-Andéol is an administrative division of the Ardèche department, southern France. Its borders were modified at the French canton reorganisation which came into effect in March 2015. Its seat is in Bourg-Saint-Andéol.

It consists of the following communes:
 
Bidon
Bourg-Saint-Andéol
Gras
Larnas
Saint-Just-d'Ardèche
Saint-Marcel-d'Ardèche
Saint-Martin-d'Ardèche
Saint-Montan
Viviers

References

Cantons of Ardèche